Abd al-Masih Haddad (1890–1963) was a Syrian writer of the Mahjar movement and journalist. His magazine As-Sayeh (The Traveler), started in 1912 and continued until 1957, presented the works of prominent Mahjari literary figures in the United States and became the "spokesman" of the Pen League which he co-founded with Nasib Arida in 1915 or 1916. His collection Hikayat al-Mahjar (The Stories of Expatriation), which he published in 1921, extended "the scope of the readership of fiction" in modern Arabic literature according to Muhammad Mustafa Badawi.

Life
Haddad was born in Homs, then a city of Ottoman Syria (modern-day Syria), to a Greek Orthodox family. He went to the Russian Teachers' Seminary in Nazareth, where he met Mikha'il Na'ima and Nasib Arida. In 1907, he immigrated to New York, where he founded the Arabic-language magazine As-Sayeh (The Traveler) in 1912, which continued to be published until 1957. It presented the works of such Mahjari literary figures as Amin Rihani, Kahlil Gibran, Elia Abu Madi, and Na'ima. In 1915 or 1916 along with Arida he co-founded the Pen League in New York, an Arabic-language literary society, later joined by Gibran, Na'ima and other Mahjari poets in 1920. In 1921, he published his collection Hikayat al-Mahjar (The Stories of Expatriation) in As-Sayeh. Another of his works, Intiba'at Mughtarib (Travel Account), which he had written after a short visit to Syria, was published in Damascus in 1962.

Works

Notes

References

Bibliography

External links
 Works by Abd al-Masih Haddad (Arabic Collections Online)

1890 births
1963 deaths
Syrian emigrants to the United States
People from Homs
Syrian Christians
Greek Orthodox Christians from Syria
Syrian journalists
Syrian writers
Mahjar
20th-century journalists